Jai Jawan is a 1970 Telugu-language drama film produced by D. Madhusudhana Rao under the Annapurna Pictures banner and directed by D. Yoganand. It stars Akkineni Nageswara Rao, Bharathi and Krishnam Raju, with music composed by S. Rajeswara Rao.

Plot
The film begins, during the time of India - China war when a freedom fighter Madhava Rao (Gummadi) toils for the welfare of the public with his daughter Bharati (Chandrakala), niece Kasthuri (Manjula), and his son Ravindra Nath (Akkineni Nageswara Rao) serves in Indian Army. Besides, his malicious brother-in-law Narasimham (Nagabhushanam) is a secret agent of the traitors but purports himself as a patriot. On the war front, Ravi is mislaid and seriously injured when a nurse Susheela (Bharathi) rescues him and they fall in love. Eventually, grief-stricken Madhava Rao shifts to the residence of Ravi's close friend, Dr. Raghu (Krishnam Raju) a handicap. Nevertheless, Bharathi loves and marries him. Parallelly, Narasimham's son Babu arrives from the states knitting a foreign girl Lilly (Lilly). After some time, Ravi returns along with Susheela and conveys his intention to marry her which is opposed by Narasimham & his wife Sundaramma (Suryakantham) as they aspire to couple up Kasthuri with him. Despite Ravi moving ahead, just before the wedding, Susheela dies in a car accident when dispirited Ravi tours all over the country. During, as a flabbergast, he spots Susheela alive. Later he realizes her as Sujatha (again Bharathi) the twin sister of Susheela who enhances him and he proposes to her which she denies. However, Ravi follows her, when he learns Sujatha's alliance is already fixed with her fosterers' son Ramu whose whereabouts are not known. At present, the elders convince Sujatha for espousal when, unfortunately, the Indian army declares an emergency, so, Ravi pauses the wedding and leaves for the battlefield. At the same time, it is revealed, that Raghu is the only Ramu who stayed behind due to his disability. Meanwhile, Narasimham intrigues to destroy important runways of the country when Ravi breaks out his ploy. Here, surprisingly, Lilly turns into a CBI officer and apprehends him. Finally, Ravi is honored by Govt of India and the movie ends on a happy note with the marriage of Ravi & Sujatha.

Cast
Akkineni Nageswara Rao as Captain Ravindranath "Ravi"
Bharathi as Susheela & Sujatha (Dual role)
Krishnam Raju as Dr. Raghu Ram
Gummadi as Madhava Rao
Nagabhushanam as Narasimha Rao
Allu Ramalingaiah as Venkatramaiah
Padmanabham as Babu
Mada as Rahim
Bhanu Prakash as Sivaiah
Manjula as Kasthuri
Chandrakala as Bharathi
Suryakantham as Sundaramma
G. Varalakshmi as Lakshmi 
Lilly as Lilly

Crew
Art: G. V. Subba Rao
Choreography: Tangappan
Dialogues: D. V. Narasa Raju
Lyrics: Dasaradhi, Sri Sri, C. Narayana Reddy, Kosaraju
Playback: Ghantasala, P. Susheela, Pithapuram
Music: S. Rajeswara Rao
Story: Yaddanapudi Sulochana Rani
Editing: M. S. Mani
Cinematography: P. S. Selvaraj
Producer: D. Madhusudhana Rao
Screenplay - Director:  D. Yoganand 
Banner: Annapurna Pictures
Release Date: 1970

Soundtrack

Music composed by S. Rajeswara Rao. Music released on Audio Company.

References

External links
 

1970 films
1970s Telugu-language films
1970s war drama films
Indian war drama films
Films directed by D. Yoganand
Films scored by S. Rajeswara Rao
Films based on novels by Yaddanapudi Sulochana Rani
1970 drama films